The 1904–05 United States Senate elections were held on various dates in various states, coinciding with President Theodore Roosevelt's landslide election to a full term and the 1904 House of Representatives elections. As these U.S. Senate elections were prior to the ratification of the Seventeenth Amendment in 1913, senators were chosen by state legislatures. Senators were elected over a wide range of time throughout 1904 and 1905, and a seat may have been filled months late or remained vacant due to legislative deadlock. In these elections, terms were up for the senators in Class 1.

Party share of seats remained roughly the same, when including vacancies and appointments, and the Republicans retained a significant majority over the Democrats.

Special elections were held in Indiana and Massachusetts, in the former due to the ascension of Charles Fairbanks to the Vice Presidency and in the latter due to the death of longtime Senator George Hoar.

In Georgia, the legislature failed to elect until shortly after the beginning of the 59th Congress on March 4. In Delaware the legislature deadlocked and did not elect a Senator until June 1906.

Results summary 
Senate party division, 59th Congress (1905–1907)

 Majority party: Republican (58)
 Minority party: Democratic (32)
 Other parties: (0)
 Total seats: 90

Change in Senate composition

Before the elections 
At the beginning of 1904.

Result of the general elections

Beginning of the next Congress

Race summaries

Elections during the 58th Congress

Special elections 
In these elections, the winners were seated during 1904 or in 1905 before March 4; ordered by election date.

In this election, the winner was seated March 4, 1905.

Early elections 
In these elections, the winners were seated March 4, 1907, in the 60th Congress; ordered by election date.

Races leading to the 59th Congress 
In these general elections, the winners were elected for the term beginning March 4, 1905; ordered by state.

All of the elections involved the Class 1 seats.

Elections during the 59th Congress 
In these elections, the winners were elected in 1905 after March 4; sorted by election date.

Maryland 

Isidor Rayner defeated incumbent Louis E. McComas by a margin of 40.98%, or 50 votes for the Class 1 seat.

New York 

The 1905 election in New York was held on January 17, 1905, by the New York State Legislature.  Republican Chauncey M. Depew had been elected to this seat in 1899, and his term would expire on March 3, 1905.  At the State election in November 1904, large Republican majorities were elected for a two-year term (1905-1906) in the State Senate, and for the session of 1905 to the Assembly. The 128th State Legislature met from January 3, 1905, on at Albany, New York.

Late in 1904, Ex-Governor Frank S. Black tried to be nominated to succeed Depew. Black was supported by Governor Benjamin B. Odell Jr., but after intense fighting behind the scenes, Odell finally dropped Black and accepted Depew's re-election which had been supported by his fellow Senator Thomas C. Platt and Speaker S. Frederick Nixon. The Republican caucus met on January 16. They re-nominated the incumbent U.S. Senator Chauncey M. Depew unanimously.

The Democratic caucus met also on January 16. They nominated again Smith M. Weed who had been the candidate of the Democratic minority in the U.S. Senate election of 1887.

Chauncey M. Depew was the choice of both the Assembly and the State Senate, and was declared elected.

Note: The votes were cast on January 17, but both Houses met in a joint session on January 18 to compare nominations, and declare the result.

Pennsylvania 

The election in Pennsylvania was held on January 17, 1905. Incumbent Philander C. Knox was elected by the Pennsylvania State Assembly to his first full term in the United States Senate.

Republican Matthew Quay was elected by the Pennsylvania General Assembly to the United States Senate in the previous election in January 1901. He served until his death on May 28, 1904. In June 1904, Republican Philander C. Knox was appointed to serve out the remainder of Quay's term, ending on March 4, 1905, when he began a term in his own right.

The Pennsylvania General Assembly, consisting of the House of Representatives and Senate, convened on January 17, 1905, to elect a Senator to serve the term beginning on March 4, 1905. The results of the vote of both houses combined are as follows:

|-
| colspan=3 align=right | Totals
| align=right | 254
| align=right | 100.00%
|}

See also 
 1904 United States elections
 1904 United States presidential election
 1904 United States House of Representatives elections
 58th United States Congress
 59th United States Congress

Notes

References 
 Party Division in the Senate, 1789-Present, via Senate.gov
 
 
 New York
 
 
 
 
 
 
 Pennsylvania: